Ivan Deyanov (16 December 1937 – 26 September 2018) was a Bulgarian footballer who played as a goalkeeper, later manager. He played for Bulgaria in the 1966 FIFA World Cup. He also played for Lokomotiv Sofia.

Honours 
Lokomotiv Sofia
Bulgarian League: 1963–64

References

External links
FIFA profile

1937 births
2018 deaths
Bulgarian footballers
Bulgaria international footballers
Association football goalkeepers
FC Lokomotiv 1929 Sofia players
First Professional Football League (Bulgaria) players
1966 FIFA World Cup players
Footballers from Sofia